The basketball tournament at the 1997 Mediterranean Games was held in Bari, Italy.

Medalists

References
1997 Competition Medalists

Basketball
Basketball at the Mediterranean Games
International basketball competitions hosted by Italy
1996–97 in Italian basketball
1996–97 in European basketball
1996–97 in Asian basketball
1997 in African basketball